Norma Deloris Egstrom (May 26, 1920 – January 21, 2002), known professionally as Peggy Lee, was an American jazz and popular music singer, songwriter, composer, and actress, over a career spanning seven decades. From her beginning as a vocalist on local radio to singing with Benny Goodman's big band, Lee created  a sophisticated persona, writing music for films, acting, and recording conceptual record albums combining poetry and music. Called the "Queen of American pop music," Lee recorded over 1,100 masters and composed over 270 songs.

Early life
Lee was born Norma Deloris Egstrom in Jamestown, North Dakota, United States, on May 26, 1920, the seventh of the eight children of Selma Emele (née Anderson) Egstrom and Marvin Olaf Egstrom, a station agent for the Midland Continental Railroad. Her family were Lutherans. Her father was Swedish-American and her mother was Norwegian-American. After her mother died when Lee was four, her father married Minnie Schaumberg Wiese.

Lee and her family lived in several towns along the Midland Continental Railroad (Jamestown, Nortonville and Wimbledon). She graduated from Wimbledon High School in 1937. The Wimbledon depot building, where she and her family lived and worked, became the Midland Continental Depot Transportation Museum, featuring The Peggy Lee Exhibit, in 2012. The upper floor of the museum, where the Egstrom family once lived, features exhibits that trace Lee's career and her regional and state connection.

Lee began singing from a young age. In Wimbledon, Lee was the female singer for a six-piece college dance band with leader Lyle "Doc" Haines. She traveled to various locations with Haines' quintet on Fridays after school and on weekends.

Lee first sang professionally over KOVC radio in Valley City, North Dakota, in 1936. She later had her own 15-minute Saturday radio show sponsored by a local restaurant that paid her salary in food. Both during and after her high-school years, Lee sang for small sums on local radio stations.

In October 1937, radio personality Ken Kennedy, of WDAY in Fargo, (the most widely heard station in North Dakota), auditioned Egstrom and put her on the air that day, but not before he changed her name to Peggy Lee.

Lee left home and traveled to Hollywood, California, at the age of 17 in March 1938. Her first job was seasonal work on Balboa Island, Newport Beach as a short order cook and waitress at Harry's Cafe. When the job ended after Easter, she was hired to work as a carnival barker at the Balboa Fun Zone. She wrote about this experience in the song, "The Nickel Ride", which she composed with Dave Grusin for the 1974 film of the same name.

Later in 1938, Lee returned to Hollywood to audition for the MC at The Jade. Her employment was cut short when she fainted onstage due to overwork and an inadequate diet. After she was taken to the Hollywood Presbyterian Medical Center she was told she needed a tonsillectomy. Lee returned to North Dakota for the operation.

The following year, remaining in North Dakota, she was hired to perform regularly at The Powers Hotel in Fargo, and toured with both the Sev Olson and the Will Osborne Orchestras.

When Lee returned to California in 1940, she took a job singing at The Doll House in Palm Springs. Here, she developed her trademark sultry purr, having decided to compete with the noisy crowd with subtlety rather than volume.

While performing at The Doll House, Lee met Frank Bering, the owner of the Ambassador East and West in Chicago. He offered her a gig at the Buttery Room, a nightclub in the Ambassador Hotel West. There, she was noticed by bandleader Benny Goodman. According to Lee:

She joined his band in August 1941 and made her first recording, singing "Elmer's Tune". Lee stayed with the Benny Goodman Orchestra for two years.

Recording career
In 1942, Lee had her first number-one hit, "Somebody Else Is Taking My Place", followed in 1943 by "Why Don't You Do Right?", which sold more than one million copies and made her famous. She sang with Goodman's orchestra in two 1943 films, Stage Door Canteen and The Powers Girl.

In March 1943, Lee married Dave Barbour, a guitarist in Goodman's band. Lee said:

She drifted back to songwriting and occasional recording sessions for Capitol Records in 1944, for whom she recorded a long string of hits, many of them with lyrics and music by Lee and Barbour, including "I Don't Know Enough About You" and "It's a Good Day". Her recording of "Golden Earrings", the title song of a 1947 movie, was a hit throughout 1947–1948. "Mañana", written by Lee and Barbour, was her eleventh solo hit recording, and remained on the charts for twenty-one weeks, nine of which were in the number one position.  The song sold over a million copies, and earned the Top Disc Jockey Record of the Year award from Billboard magazine. From 1946 to 1949, Lee also recorded for Capitol's library of electrical transcriptions for radio stations. An advertisement for Capitol Transcriptions in a trade magazine noted that the transcriptions included "special voice introductions by Peggy".

In 1948, Lee joined vocalists Perry Como and Jo Stafford as a host of the NBC Radio musical program The Chesterfield Supper Club. She was a regular on The Jimmy Durante Show and appeared frequently on Bing Crosby's radio shows during the late 1940s and early 1950s.

Her relationship with Capitol spanned almost three decades aside from a brief detour (1952–1956) at Decca. For that label, she recorded Black Coffee and had hit singles such as "Lover" and "Mister Wonderful".

In 1958, she recorded her own version of "Fever" by Little Willie John, written by Eddie Cooley and John Davenport,. Lee created a new arrangement for the song, and added lyrics ("Romeo loved Juliet", "Captain Smith and Pocahontas"), which she neglected to copyright. Her new version of "Fever" was a hit, and was nominated in three categories at the First Annual Grammy Awards in 1959, including Record of the Year and Song of the Year.

While Lee was in London for a 1970 engagement at Royal Albert Hall, she invited Paul and Linda McCartney to dinner at The Dorchester. At the dinner, the couple gifted Lee with a song they had written entitled, "Let's Love". In July 1974, with Paul McCartney producing, Lee recorded the song at the Record Plant in Los Angeles, and it became the title track for her 40th album, her only one on Atlantic Records.

Acting career
Lee starred opposite Danny Thomas in The Jazz Singer (1952), a remake of the Al Jolson film, The Jazz Singer (1927). She played an alcoholic blues singer in Pete Kelly's Blues (1955), for which she was nominated for the Academy Award for Best Supporting Actress.

Lee provided speaking and singing voices for several characters in the Disney movie Lady and the Tramp (1955), playing the human Darling, the dog Peg, and the two Siamese cats, Si and Am. She also co-wrote, with Sonny Burke, all of the original songs for the film, including "He's A Tramp", "Bella Notte", "La La Lu", "The Siamese Cat Song", and "Peace on Earth". In 1987, when Lady and the Tramp was released on VHS, Lee sought performance and song royalties on the video sales. When the Disney company refused to pay, she filed a lawsuit in 1988. After a prolonged legal battle, in 1992, Lee was awarded $2.3 million for breach of contract, plus $500,000 for unjust enrichment, $600,000 for illegal use of Lee's voice and $400,000 for the use of her name.

Peggy Lee also wrote the lyrics for "Johnny Guitar" (with music composer Victor Young), the title track of the 1954 film, Johnny Guitar, which she sings partially at the end of the movie.

During her career, Lee appeared in hundreds of variety shows, and several TV movies and specials.

Personal life
Lee was married four times: to guitarist and composer Dave Barbour (1943–1951), actor Brad Dexter (1953), actor Dewey Martin (1956–1958), and percussionist Jack Del Rio (1964). All the marriages ended in divorce.

She gave birth to her only child at age 23, daughter Nicki Lee Foster, on November 11, 1943. Nicki's father was Peggy's first husband, Dave Barbour.

Lee learned Transcendental Meditation and said she was taught "by the Maharishi personally and that was a great honor."

Death
Lee continued to perform into the 1990s, sometimes using a wheelchair. After years of poor health, she died of complications from diabetes and a heart attack on January 21, 2002, at the age of 81. She was cremated and her ashes were buried with a bench-style monument in Westwood Village Memorial Park Cemetery in Los Angeles.

Awards and honors
Lee was nominated for 13 Grammy Awards. In 1969, her hit "Is That All There Is?" won her the Grammy for Best Contemporary Vocal Performance. In 1995, she was given the Grammy Lifetime Achievement Award.

She received the Rough Rider Award from the state of North Dakota in 1975, the Pied Piper Award from the American Society of Composers, Authors and Publishers in 1990, the Ella Award for Lifetime Achievement from the Society of Singers in 1994, the Living Legacy Award from the Women's International Center in 1994, and the Presidents Award from the Songwriters Guild of America in 1999. Other honors include induction into the Big Band Jazz Hall of Fame in 1992, the Songwriters Hall of Fame in 1999, and the Songbook Hall of Fame from the Great American Songbook Foundation in 2020.

Tributes and legacy
Lee is often cited as the inspiration for the Margarita cocktail. In 1948, after a trip to Mexico, she and her husband ventured into the Balinese Room in Galveston, Texas. She requested a drink similar to one she had had in Mexico, and the head bartender, Santos Cruz, created the Margarita, and named it after the Spanish version of Peggy's name.

Lee was awarded a star on the Hollywood Walk of Fame for Recording in 1960. The star is located at 6319 Hollywood Boulevard in California.

Baseball's Tug McGraw, whose career with both the New York Mets and Philadelphia Phillies ranged from 1965 to 1984, named one of his pitches the Peggy Lee. He explained to The Philadelphia Inquirer: "That's the one where the hitter is out in front of it and says, 'Is that all there is?'"

In 1971, Lee sang the Lord's Prayer at the funeral of Louis Armstrong.

The designer of the Miss Piggy Muppet, Bonnie Erickson, who grew up in Lee's home state of North Dakota, used the singer as inspiration for the Miss Piggy character in 1974. Originally called Miss Piggy Lee, her name was shortened to Miss Piggy when the Muppet gained fame.

In 1975, Lee received an honorary doctorate in music from North Dakota State University, and in 2000, she received another from Jamestown University.

In 1983, Lee had a hybrid tea rose named in her honor that was pink with a touch of peach. The Peggy Lee Rose was the 1983 American Beauty Rose of the Year.

In 2003, "There'll Be Another Spring: A Tribute to Miss Peggy Lee" was held at Carnegie Hall.  Produced by recording artist Richard Barone, the sold-out event included performances by Cy Coleman, Debbie Harry, Nancy Sinatra, Rita Moreno, Marian McPartland, Chris Connor, Petula Clark, Maria Muldaur, Dee Dee Bridgewater, Quincy Jones, Shirley Horn, and others. In 2004, Barone brought the event to a sold-out Hollywood Bowl, and then to Chicago's Ravinia Festival, with expanded casts including Maureen McGovern, Jack Jones, and Bea Arthur. The Carnegie Hall concert was broadcast on NPR's JazzSet.

On the occasion of the 100th anniversary of Lee's birth, May 26, 2020, The Grammy Museum hosted an online panel discussion featuring musicians Billie Eilish, k.d. lang, Eric Burton (The Black Pumas), as well as Lee's granddaughter, Holly Foster Wells, and the author of Peggy Lee: A Century of Song, Dr. Tish Oney.

Lee has been noted as a musical influence on other artists such as Paul McCartney, Madonna, Beyoncé, k.d. lang, Elvis Costello, Diana Krall, Dusty Springfield, Rita Coolidge, Rita Moreno, and Billie Eilish.

In 2020, the ASCAP Foundation, along with Lee's family, established the annual Peggy Lee Songwriter Award. The inaugural award went to Michael Blum and Jenna Lotti for their song, "Fake ID".

Discography

 Rendezvous with Peggy Lee (Capitol, 1948; 1950 [10"]; 1955 [12"])
 Benny Goodman with Peggy Lee (Columbia, 1949)
 My Best to You: Peggy Lee Sings (Capitol, 1950)
 Road to Bali: Selections from the Paramount Picture (Decca, 1952)
 Black Coffee (Decca, 1953; 1956 [12"])
 Selections from Irving Berlin's White Christmas (Decca, 1954)
 Peggy: Songs in an Intimate Style (Decca, 1954)
 Songs from Pete Kelly's Blues (Decca, 1955)
 Songs from Walt Disney's Lady and the Tramp (Decca, 1955)
 The Man I Love (Capitol, 1957)
 Peggy Lee Sings with Benny Goodman (Harmony, 1957)
 Dream Street (Decca, 1957)
 Jump for Joy (Capitol, 1958)
 Things Are Swingin' (Capitol, 1958)
 Miss Wonderful (Decca, 1958)
 Sea Shells (Decca, 1958)
 Beauty and the Beat! with George Shearing (Capitol, 1959)
 I Like Men! (Capitol, 1959)
 Christmas Carousel (Capitol, 1960)
 Latin ala Lee! (Capitol, 1960)
 Pretty Eyes (Capitol, 1960)
 Basin Street East Proudly Presents Miss Peggy Lee (Capitol, 1961)
 If You Go (Capitol, 1961)
 Olé ala Lee (Capitol, 1960)
 All Aglow Again! (1960)
 Sugar 'n' Spice (Capitol, 1962)
 Blues Cross Country (Capitol, 1962)
 The Fabulous Peggy Lee (Decca, 1963)
 Mink Jazz (Capitol, 1963)
 The Fabulous Miss Lee (World Record Club, 1963)
 I'm a Woman (Capitol, 1963)
 Lover (Decca, 1963)
 In the Name of Love (Capitol, 1964)
 In Love Again! (Capitol, 1964)
 Then Was Then – Now Is Now! (Capitol, 1965)
 Pass Me By (Capitol, 1965)
 Happy Holiday (Capitol, 1965)
 Guitars a là Lee (Capitol, 1966)
 Big $pender (Capitol, 1966)
 So Blue (Vocalion, 1966)
 Extra Special! (Capitol, 1967)
 Somethin' Groovy! (Capitol, 1967)
 2 Shows Nightly (Capitol, 1968)
 Is That All There Is? (Capitol, 1969)
 A Natural Woman (Capitol, 1969)
 Bridge Over Troubled Water (Capitol, 1970)
 Make It With You (Capitol, 1970)
 Crazy in the Heart (Vocalion, 1970)
 Where Did They Go (Capitol, 1971)
 Norma Deloris Egstrom from Jamestown, North Dakota (Capitol, 1972)
 Peggy Lee (Everest Archive, 1974)
 Let's Love (Atlantic, 1974)
 Mirrors (A&M, 1975)
 Peggy (Polydor, 1977)
 Live in London (Polydor, 1977)
 Walt Disney's Lady and the Tramp: All the Songs from the Film (Disneyland, 1979)
 Close Enough for Love (DRG, 1979)
 You Can Depend On Me: 14 Previously Unreleased Songs (Glendale, 1981)
 The Music Makers Program 116 for Broadcast Week of 4/19/82 (Music Makers, 1982)
 Easy Listening with Woody Herman, Dave Barbour (Artistic Art, 1984)
 The Uncollected Peggy Lee (Hindsight, 1985)
 If I Could Be with You (Sounds Rare 1986)
 Miss Peggy Lee Sings the Blues (Musicmasters, 1988)
 The Peggy Lee Songbook: There'll Be Another Spring (Musical Heritage Society, 1990)
 Peggy Lee with the Dave Barbour Band (Laserlight, 1991)
 Love Held Lightly: Rare Songs by Harold Arlen (Angel, 1993)
 Moments Like This (Chesky, 1993)

Songwriting
Lee wrote or co-wrote over 270 songs. In addition to her own material to sing, she was hired to score and compose songs for movies.  For the Disney movie Lady and the Tramp, she co-composed all of the original songs with Burke, and supplied the singing and speaking voices of four characters.

Over the years, her songwriting collaborators included David Barbour, Laurindo Almeida, Harold Arlen, Sonny Burke, Cy Coleman, Duke Ellington, Dave Grusin, Quincy Jones, Francis Lai, Jack Marshall, Johnny Mandel, Marian McPartland, Willard Robison, Lalo Schifrin, and Victor Young.

Her first published song was in 1941, "Little Fool". "What More Can a Woman Do?" was recorded by Sarah Vaughan with Dizzy Gillespie and Charlie Parker. "Mañana (Is Soon Enough for Me)" was number one on the Billboard singles chart for nine weeks in 1948, from the week of March 13 to May 8.

Lee was a mainstay of Capitol Records when rock and roll came onto the American music scene. She was among the first of the "old guard" to recognize this new genre, as seen by her recording music from the Beatles, Randy Newman, Carole King, James Taylor, and other up-and-coming songwriters. From 1957 until her final disc for the company in 1972, she produced a steady stream of two or three albums per year that usually included standards (often arranged quite differently from the original), her own compositions, and material from young artists.

Many of her compositions have become standards, performed by singers such as Tony Bennett, Nat King Cole, Natalie Cole, Bing Crosby, Doris Day, Ella Fitzgerald, Judy Garland, Diana Krall, Queen Latifah, Barry Manilow, Bette Midler, Janelle Monae, Nina Simone, Regina Spektor, Sarah Vaughan and others.

Chart hits

Singles

Albums

Bibliography
 Friedwald, Will. Liner notes for The Best of Peggy Lee: The Capitol Years.
 Gavin, James. Is That All There Is? – The Strange Life of Peggy Lee. Atria Books, 2014. 
 Lee, Peggy. Miss Peggy Lee: An Autobiography. Donald I. Fine, 1989. 
 Oney, Dr. Tish Oney, Peggy Lee: A Century of Song. Rowman & Littlefield, 2020. 
 Richmond, Peter, Fever: The Life and Music of Miss Peggy Lee. Henry Holt and Company, 2006. 
 Strom, Robert. Miss Peggy Lee: A Career Chronicle. McFarland Publishing, 2005.

References

External links

 
 Peggy Lee Discography
 
 
 Review of a Peggy Lee biography by Mark Steyn
 Peggy Lee Interview NAMM Oral History Library (1994)

1920 births
2002 deaths
20th-century American actresses
20th-century American composers
20th-century American singers
20th-century American women singers
20th-century jazz composers
20th-century Lutherans
20th-century women composers
A&M Records artists
American autobiographers
American contraltos
American jazz composers
American Lutherans
American people of Norwegian descent
American people of Swedish descent
American radio personalities
American voice actresses
American women composers
American women jazz singers
American jazz singers
American women pop singers
Atlantic Records artists
Big band singers
Burials at Westwood Village Memorial Park Cemetery
Capitol Records artists
Chesky Records artists
Deaths from diabetes
Decca Records artists
Grammy Award winners
Grammy Lifetime Achievement Award winners
People from Jamestown, North Dakota
Polydor Records artists
Singers from North Dakota
Songwriters from North Dakota
Torch singers
Traditional pop music singers
Women autobiographers
Women jazz composers